Always a Witch is a Colombian streaming television series starring Angely Gaviria, Sofia Bernal Araujo, Dylan Fuentes, Valeria Henríquez, Carlos Quintero with Lenard Vanderaa. The plot revolves around Carmen Eguiluz (Angely Gaviria), a witch and slave from 1646, and is set both in the 17th-century and present-day Cartagena, Colombia. It was ordered direct-to-series, and the first full season premiered on Netflix streaming on January 1, 2019. It was renewed by Netflix for a second season, which aired worldwide on February 28, 2020. The show is dubbed in English for English speakers.

Premise
In Always a Witch, Carmen Eguiluz (Angely Gaviria) is accused of witchcraft and is set to burn at the stake, according to the way of the Inquisition in 1646 colonial Colombia. While imprisoned and waiting for her execution, Carmen makes a deal with the wizard Aldemar, which makes her able to time-travel to 2019 in exchange for a favor. She won't be able to use magic there though, since it would make Lucien, a powerful but evil wizard, aware of her presence.

Reception
The series has received mixed reviews from critics. While some praised the show for having a strong black female lead character, others have criticized the enslaved/enslaver romance, and the lead character's willingness to return to the 1600s, thus returning to being a slave, just to be with her enslaver's son.

Cast

Main
 Angely Gaviria as Carmen Eguiluz, a powerful witch from the 1640s who is propelled forward in time to 2019.
 Dylan Fuentes as Johnny Ki, Carmen's best friend and confidante in 2019.
 Sofia Bernal Araujo as Alicia, Carmen's friend in 2019. In 2020, she begins delving into witchcraft herself.
 Valeria Henríquez as Mayte, León's girlfriend and one of Carmen's friends in 2019.
 Carlos Quintero as León, Mayte's boyfriend and one of Carmen's friends in 2019.
 Sebastián Eslava as Esteban, Carmen's, León's, Alicia's, Mayte's and Daniel's professor in 2019. 
 Lenard Vanderaa as Cristobal De Aranoa, Carmen's lover in 1646. 
 Luis Fernando Hoyos as Aldemar the Immortal, a powerful wizard held captive in 1646. (Season 1)
 Oscar Casas as Kobo, a pirate from the late 17th century who finds himself in 2020, and who has a mysterious connection to Alicia. (Season 2)

Recurring
 Cristina Warner as Isabel de Aranoa, Cristobal's mother in 1646. 
 Edu Martín as Fernando De Aranoa, Cristobal's father in 1646. (Season 1)
 Juan Manuel Mendoza as Detective Pablo Corcel
 Verónica Orozco as Ninibé
 John Alex Castillo as Braulio
 Constanza Duque as Adelaida 
 Mayra Luna as Hilda
 Norma Nivia as Ximena Gamez 
 Dubán Andrés Prado as Daniel
 Matthew Moreno as Oscar
 Felix Mercado as Rogelio
 Indhira Serrano as Dr. Luisa

Episodes

Season 1 (2019)

Season 2 (2020)

Release
The first full season consisting of 10 episodes premiered on Netflix streaming on January 1, 2019. It was renewed by Netflix for a second season, which started airing worldwide on February 28, 2020.

References

External links

 
 
 

2010s time travel television series
2019 Colombian television series debuts
Spanish-language Netflix original programming
Television series set in 2019
Television series set in the 17th century
Television shows set in Colombia
Television series about witchcraft
Colombian fantasy television series